Variable may refer to:

 Variable (computer science), a symbolic name associated with a value and whose associated value may be changed
 Variable (mathematics), a symbol that represents a quantity in a mathematical expression, as used in many sciences
 Variable (research), a logical set of attributes
 Variable star, a type of astronomical star
 "The Variable", an episode of the television series Lost

See also 
 Variability (disambiguation)